WPGF-LD (channel 6) is a low-power television station in Memphis, Tennessee, United States. The station's audio channel, transmitting at 87.75 MHz (or VHF channel 6), lies within the FM band; as a result, WPGF-LD's audio channel operates as a radio station at 87.7 FM. Owned by Flinn Broadcasting, the station airs a album-oriented rock format via the 87.75 MHz audio channel under the brand 87.7 The Pig. WPGF-LD's transmitter is located on the northeast side of Memphis near Bartlett, Tennessee, just off US 64.

Flinn Broadcasting surrendered WPGF-LD's license to the Federal Communications Commission on June 20, 2021, and the FCC canceled it the following day. At the time, it was an affiliate of Estrella TV. The station returned to the air in January 2022 under a new license and converted to ATSC 3.0 broadcasting that month.

References

External links
RabbitEars TV Query for WPGF-LD

PGF-LD
Low-power television stations in the United States
Television channels and stations established in 2007
2007 establishments in Tennessee
ATSC 3.0 television stations
Radio stations in Memphis, Tennessee
Album-oriented rock radio stations in the United States